The 2017 Savannah Challenger was a professional tennis tournament played on clay courts. It was the ninth edition of the tournament which was part of the 2017 ATP Challenger Tour. It took place in Savannah, Georgia, United States between 1 and 7 May 2017.

Point distribution

Singles main-draw entrants

Seeds

Other entrants
The following players received wildcards into the singles main draw:
  Marcos Giron
  Christian Harrison
  Tommy Paul
  Ryan Shane

The following player received entry into the singles main draw using a protected ranking:
  Alejandro González

The following players received entry from the qualifying draw:
  Gonzalo Escobar
  Miķelis Lībietis
  Ante Pavić
  Wil Spencer

Champions

Singles

 Tennys Sandgren def.  João Pedro Sorgi 6–4, 6–3.

Doubles

 Peter Polansky /  Neal Skupski def.  Luke Bambridge /  Mitchell Krueger 4–6, 6–3, [10–1].

External links
Official Website

Savannah Challenger
Savannah Challenger
Savannah Challenger
Tennis tournaments in Georgia (U.S. state)